The 2014–15 Northern Iowa Panthers men's basketball team represented the University of Northern Iowa during the 2014–15 NCAA Division I men's basketball season. The Panthers, led by ninth year head coach Ben Jacobson, played their home games at McLeod Center and were members of the Missouri Valley Conference (The Valley). They finished the season 31–4, 16–2 in MVC play to finish in second place. They defeated Bradley, Loyola–Chicago, and Illinois State to become champions of the Missouri Valley tournament. They received an automatic bid to the NCAA tournament where they defeated Wyoming in the second round before losing in the third round to Louisville.

Previous season 
The Panthers finished the season 16–15, 10–8 in MVC play to finish in third place. They lost in the quarterfinals of the Missouri Valley Conference tournament to Southern Illinois.

Departures

Incoming Transfers

Recruiting

Class of 2015 recruits

Roster

Schedule

|-
!colspan=9 style="background:#660099; color:#FFD700;"| Exhibition

|-
!colspan=9 style="background:#660099; color:#FFD700;"| Non-Conference Regular season

|-
!colspan=9 style="background:#660099; color:#FFD700;"| Missouri Valley Conference Regular season

|-
!colspan=9 style="background:#660099; color:#FFD700;"| Missouri Valley tournament

|-
!colspan=9 style="background:#660099; color:#FFD700;"| NCAA tournament

Rankings

References

Northern Iowa Panthers men's basketball seasons
Northern Iowa
Northern Iowa
Panth
Panth